Dittus is a surname. Notable people with the surname include:

Barbara Dittus (1939–2001), German actress
Hansjörg Dittus, German physicist
Uwe Dittus (born 1959), German footballer
Wolf Dittus (born 1943), German primatologist and behavioral ecologist

See also
Dattus